Luigi is a masculine Italian given name. It is the Italian form of the German name Ludwig, through the Latinization Ludovicus, corresponding to the French form Louis and its anglicized variant Lewis. 

Other forms of the same name in Italian are the names Ludovico, Clodoveo, Aloísio and Alvise, the last form being more frequent in the Veneto region. A derived feminine name is Luigina.

People with the given name Luigi

Royalty
 Prince Luigi Amedeo (1873–1933), Italian prince

Crime and law
 Luigi Chiatti (born 1968), serial killer
 Luigi de Magistris (politician) (born 1967), prosecutor
 Luigi Ferrari Bravo (1933–2016), jurist
 Luigi Giuliano (born 1949), Camorrista of the Giuliano clan
 Luigi Lucheni (1873–1910), anarchist and assassin
 Luigi Manocchio (born 1927), Italian-American mobster
 Luigi Riccio (born 1957), pentito and former Camorrista
 Luigi Scotti (born 1932), judge
 Luigi Vollaro, Camorrista of the Vollaro clan

Engineering and mathematics
 Luigi Bianchi (1856–1928), mathematician
 Luigi Colani (1928–2019), German industrial designer
 Luigi Cremona (1830–1903), mathematician
 Luigi Dadda (1923–2012), computer engineer
 Luigi Fantappiè (1901–1956), mathematician
 Luigi Poletti (mathematician) (1864–1967), mathematician and poet
 Luigi Segre (1919–1963), automotive designer and engineer
 Luigi Vanvitelli (1700–1773), engineer and architect

Film and television
 Luigi Almirante (1886–1963), film actor
 Luigi Batzella, Z-movie director
 Luigi Bonos (1910–2000), film actor
 Luigi Capuano (1904–1979), film director and screenwriter
 Luigi Cimara (1891–1962), film actor
 Luigi Comencini (1916–2007), film director
 Luigi Cozzi (born 1947), movie director and screenwriter
 Luigi Filippo D'Amico (1924–2007), director and writer
 Luigi Gervasi, set decorator from 1947–68
 Luigi Lo Cascio (born 1967), actor
 Luigi Magni (1928-2013), screenwriter and film director
 Luigi Pane (born 1977), director and video artist
 Luigi Pavese (1896–1969), film actor
 Luigi Petrucci (born 1956), film and television actor
 Luigi Pistilli (1929–1996), actor of stage, screen, and television
 Luigi Scaccianoce (1914–1981), production designer, art director, and set decorator
 Luigi Zampa (1905–1991), film-maker

Journalism and literature
 Luigi Alamanni (1495–1556), poet and statesman
 Luigi Albertini (1871–1941), journalist and antifascist
 Luigi Ballerini (born 1940), poet, professor, and historian of gastronomy
 Luigi Bartolini (1892–1963), writer, poet, and painter
 Luigi Barzini, Jr. (1908–1984), Italian-American journalist
 Luigi Barzini, Sr. (1874–1947), journalist, war correspondent, and writer
 Luigi Capuana (1839–1915), author, journalist, and member of the Verist movement
 Luigi Chiarelli (1880–1947), playwright, theatre critic, and writer of short stories
 Luigi Da Porto (1485–1529), writer and storiographer
 Luigi Fabbri (1877–1935), anarchist, writer, agitator, and propagandist
 Luigi Fontanella (born 1943), poet, critic, translator, playwright, and novelist
 Luigi Freddi (1895–1977), journalist and politician
 Luigi Malerba (1927–2008), author and co-founder of the Gruppo 63
 Luigi Meneghello (1922–2007), contemporary writer and scholar
 Luigi Pirandello (1867–1936), writer
 Luigi Pulci (1432–1484), poet best known for Morgante
 Luigi Tansillo (1510–1568), poet of the Petrarchian and Marinist schools
 Luigi Ugolini (1891–1980), writer

Military, nobility, and politics
 Luigi Alidosi (died 1430), lord of Imola from 1391 to 1424
 Luigi Amedeo, Duke of the Abruzzi (1873–1933), Italian prince, mountaineer, and explorer
 Luigi Antonini (1883–1968), American trade union leader
 Luigi Arisio (1926–2020), Italian politician
 Luigi Berlinguer (born 1932), Italian politician
 Luigi Bertoldi (1920–2001), Italian politician 
 Luigi Braschi Onesti (before 1787–1816), nephew of Pope Pius VI
 Luigi Cacciatore (1900–1951), Italian politician
 Luigi Cadorna (1850–1928), Italian general and marshal 
 Luigi Capello (1859–1941), Italian general
 Luigi Castagnola (politician) (born 1936), Italian politician
 Luigi Cocilovo (born 1947), Member of the European Parliament and University researcher in law
 Luigi Cornaro (1464–1566), Venetian nobleman
 Luigi, Count Cibrario (1802–1870), statesman and historian
 Luigi dal Verme (?–1449), condottiero
 Luigi Durand de la Penne (1914–1992), naval diver during World War II
 Luigi Einaudi (1874–1961), politician and economist
 Luigi R. Einaudi, U.S. career diplomat
 Luigi Facta (1861–1930), politician and journalist
 Luigi Carlo Farini (1812–1866), Italian physician, statesman, and historian
 Luigi Federzoni (1878–1967), nationalist and later Fascist politician
 Luigi Ferdinando Marsigli (1658–1730), soldier and naturalist
 Luigi Frusci (1879–1949), Royal Army officer during World War II
 Luigi Gorrini (1917–2014), Italian fighter pilot during World War II
 Luigi Granelli (1929–1999), Italian politician
 Luigi Gui (1914–2010), politician and philosopher
 Luigi Lonfernini (born 1938), Captain Regent of San Marino in 1971 and 2001
 Luigi Longo (1900–1980), Italian communist politician and secretary of the Italian Communist Party
 Luigi Luzzatti (1841–1927), politician who served as Prime Minister between 1910 and 1911
 Luigi Mazzella (born 1932), Italian jurist and politician
 Luigi Miceli (1824–1906), patriot, politician, and military figure
 Luigi Mocenigo (disambiguation), multiple people
 Luigi Palma di Cesnola (1832–1904), Italian-American soldier and amateur archaeologist
 Luigi Parrilli, aristocrat
 Luigi Pelloux (1839–1924), general and politician
 Luigi Perenni (1913–1943), military officer and skier
 Luigi Razza (1892–1935),Italian journalist and politician
 Luigi Rava (1860–1938), Italian politician 
 Luigi Rizzo (1887–1951), naval officer and torpedo boat commander
 Luigi Settembrini (1813–1877), Neapolitan man of letters and politician
 Luigi Spaventa (1934–2013), Italian academic and politician
 Luigi Viviani (born 1937), Italian politician
 Luigi Viviani (soldier) (1903–1943), Italian engineer and soldier

Music
 Luigi Alva, tenore leggiero
 Luigi Antinori (c. 1697–?), tenor
 Luigi Antonio Sabbatini (1732–1809), composer and music theorist
 Luigi Arditi (1822–1903), violinist, composer, and conductor
 Luigi Attademo (born 1972), classical guitarist
 Luigi Bassi (1766–1825), operatic baritone
 Luigi Boccherini (1743–1805), cellist and composer
 Luigi Cherubini (1760–1842), Italian-born composer
 Luigi Creatore (1921–2015), American songwriter and record producer
 Luigi Dallapiccola (1904–1975), composer known for lyrical twelve-tone compositions
 Ivan Della Mea (born as Luigi), singer-songwriter
 Luigi Denza (1846–1922), composer
 Luigi Gatti (1740–1817), classical composer
 Luigi Illica (1857–1919), librettist
 Luigi Infantino (1921–1991), operatic tenor
 Luigi Lablache (1794–1858), bass singer of French and Irish heritage
 Luigi Legnani (1790–1877), guitarist and composer
 Luigi Marchesi (1754–1829), castrato singer
 Luigi Marini (1885–1942), Italian lyric tenor
 Luigi Morleo (born 1970), percussionist and composer of contemporary music
 Luigi Mostacci (1934–2003), pianist
 Luigi Negri (disambiguation), multiple people
 Luigi Nono (1924–1990), avant-garde composer of classical music
 Luigi Piazza (1884–1967), operatic baritone
 Luigi Piccioli (1812–1862), musician, singer, voice instructor, and professor
 Luigi Ricci (vocal coach) (1893–1981), assistant conductor, accompanist, vocal coach, and author
 Luigi Ricci (composer) (1805–1859), composer, particularly of operas
 Luigi Ricci-Stolz (1852–1906), musician and composer
 Luigi Rossi (1597–1653), Baroque composer
 Luigi Russolo, composer
 Luigi Sagrati (1921–2008), violinist
 Luigi Tarisio (c. 1790–1854), violin dealer and collector
 Luigi Tenco (1938–1967), singer, songwriter, and actor
 Luigi Verderame, Belgian singer usually known just as Luigi
 Luigi von Kunits (1870–1931), Austrian conductor, composer, violinist, and pedagogue
 Luigi Waites (1927–2010), American jazz drummer and vibraphonist
 Luigi Zamboni (1767–1837), operatic buffo bass-baritone
 Luigi Zenobi (1540s – after 1602), virtuoso cornett player
 [{Luigi Ippolito}] (1958 - Present) 
Jazz Drummer

Religion
 Luigi Amat di San Filippo e Sorso (1796–1878), dean of the College of Cardinals
 Luigi Bilio (1826–1884), Cardinal of the Roman Catholic Church
 Luigi Capotosti (1863–1938), Cardinal of the Roman Catholic Church
 Luigi Ciacchi (1788–1865), Cardinal of the Catholic Church
 Luigi Ciotti (born 1945), Roman Catholic priest
 Luigi Dadaglio (1914–1990), Roman Catholic Cardinal and Major Penitentiary of the Apostolic Penitentiary
 Luigi "Ossian" D'Ambrosio (born 1970), modern Druid, musician and jeweler
 Luigi De Magistris (cardinal) (1926-2022), Roman Catholic Archbishop
 Luigi d'Este (1538–1586)
 Luigi Fortis (1748–1829), Jesuit
 Luigi Giussani (1922–2005), Catholic priest, educator, and public intellectual
 Luigi Guanella (1842–1912), Catholic priest from Northern Italy
 Luigi Jacobini (1832–1887), Cardinal of the Roman Catholic Church
 Luigi Lambruschini (1776–1854), Cardinal of the Roman Catholic Church
 Luigi Lavitrano (1874–1950), Cardinal of the Roman Catholic Church
 Luigi Lippomano (1500–1559), cardinal and hagiographer
 Luigi Locati (1928–2005), Catholic missionary and bishop
 Luigi Macchi (1832–1907), Catholic nobleman and Cardinal
 Luigi Maglione (1877–1944), Cardinal of the Roman Catholic Church
 Luigi Mascolo, priest who defected to the Brazilian Catholic Apostolic Church
 Luigi Mozzi (1746–1813), Jesuit controversialist
 Luigi Oreglia di Santo Stefano (1828–1913), Cardinal of the Catholic Church
 Luigi Orione (1872–1940), saint
 Luigi Poggi (1917-2010), Cardinal of the Roman Catholic Church
 Luigi Raimondi (1912–1975), Cardinal of the Roman Catholic Church
 Luigi Sincero (1870–1936), Roman Catholic Cardinal
 Luigi Sturzo (1871–1959), Catholic priest and politician
 Luigi Taparelli (1793–1862), Catholic scholar of the Society of Jesus
 Luigi Traglia (1895–1977), Cardinal of the Roman Catholic Church
 Luigi Tripepi (1836–1906), Roman Catholic cardinal and poet

Science
 Luigi Aloysius Colla (1766–1848), botanist
 Luigi Amoroso (1886–1965), neoclassical economist
 Luigi Bellardi (1859–1889), malacologist and entomologist
 Luigi Bodio (1840–1920), economist and statistician
 Luigi Cagnola (1762–1833), architect
 Luigi Canina (1795–1856), archaeologist and architect
 Luigi Caponaro (1567–1622), healer
 Luigi Carnera (1875–1962), astronomer
 Luigi Cossa (1831–1896), economist
 Luigi di Bella (1912–2003), medical doctor and physiology professor
 Luigi Ferri (1826–1895), philosopher
 Luigi Frati (born 1943), academic physician and rector of the Sapienza University of Rome
 Luigi Gaetano Marini (1742–1815), natural philosopher, jurist, historian, and archeologist
 Luigi Galvani (1737–1798), physician and physicist
 Luigi Guido Grandi (1671–1742), philosopher and mathematician
 Luigi Hugues (1836–1913), academic geographer and amateur musician
 Luigi Luca Cavalli-Sforza (1922–2018), population geneticist
 Luigi Maria Ugolini (1895–1936), archaeologist
 Luigi Palmieri (1807–1896), physicist and meteorologist
 Luigi Pareyson (1918–1991), philosopher
 Luigi Pasinetti (1930–2023), economist of the Post-Keynesians school
 Luigi Pernier (1874–1937), archaeologist and academic
 Luigi Piccinato (1899–1983), architect and town planner
 Luigi Pigorini (1842–1925), palaeoethnologist, archaeologist, and ethnographer
 Luigi Poletti (architect) (1792–1869), neoclassical architect
 Luigi Rosselli, Italian/Australian practicing architect
 Luigi Rizzi (born 1952), linguist
 Luigi Rolando (1773–1831), anatomist
 Luigi Salvatorelli (1886–1974), historian and publicist
 Luigi Snozzi (1932–2020), Swiss architect
 Luigi Tosti (1811–1897), Benedictine historian
 Luigi Zoja (born 1943), psychoanalyst and writer

Sports
 Luigi "Geno" Auriemma (born 1954), Italian-born American women's basketball coach

Football
 Luigi Agnolin (1943–2018), football referee
 Luigi Allemandi (1903–1978), football defender
 Luigi Anaclerio (born 1981), football striker
 Luigi Apolloni (born 1967), football manager and former player
 Luigi Barbesino (1894–1941), footballer and manager from Casale Monferrato
 Luigi Beghetto (born 1973), football striker
 Luigi Bertolini (1904–1977), football midfielder
 Luigi Bruins (born 1987), Dutch football midfielder
 Luigi Brunella (1914–1993), football manager and former defender
 Luigi Burlando (1899–1967), football midfielder
 Luigi Cagni (born 1950), football manager and former player
 Luigi Cevenini (1895–1968), football player
 Luigi De Agostini (born 1961), football defender
 Luigi De Canio (born 1957), football manager and former player
 Luigi Della Rocca (born 1984), football striker
 Luigi Delneri (born 1950), football manager and former player
 Luigi Di Biagio (born 1971), football defensive midfielder
 Luigi Ferrero (1904–1984), football manager and former player
 Luigi Garzja (born 1979), football player
 Luigi Giuliano (footballer) (1930–1993), football player
 Luigi Glombard (born 1984), football striker
 Luigi Grassi (born 1983), football midfielder
 Luigi Griffanti (1917–2006), football player
 Luigi Lavecchia (born 1981), football defender/midfielder
 Luigi Maifredi (born 1947), football manager
 Luigi Martinelli (footballer) (born 1970), football defender
 Luigi Perversi (1906–1991), football defender
 Luigi Piangerelli (born 1973), football midfielder
 Luigi Pieroni (born 1980), Belgian football striker
 Luigi Radice (1935–2018), football coach and former player
 Luigi Riccio (footballer) (born 1977), football midfielder
 Luigi Riva (born 1944), football forward
 Luigi Sala (born 1974), football defender
 Luigi Sartor (born 1975), football defender
 Luigi Scarabello (1916–2007), football player
 Luigi Sepe (born 1991), football goalkeeper
 Luigi Simoni (1939–2020), football manager and former player
 Luigi Turci (born 1970), football goalkeeper
 Luigi Vitale (born 1987), football wingback

Racing
 Luigi Arcangeli (1902–1931), motorcycle racer and race car driver
 Luigi Arienti (born 1937), racing cyclist
 Luigi Cavalieri (1914–date of death unknown), bobsledder
 Luigi Cecchini (born 1944), sports doctor, active in road bicycle racing
 Luigi Chinetti (1901–1994), Italian-born racecar driver
 Luigi de Bettin, bobsledder
 Luigi De Manincor (1910–1986), sailor
 Luigi Fagioli (1898–1952), motor racing driver
 Luigi Figoli, bobsledder
 Luigi Ganna (1883–1957), road racing cyclist
 Luigi Giacobbe (1907–1995), cyclist who raced from 1926 to 1937
 Luigi Lucotti (1893–1980), road bicycle racer
 Luigi Marchisio (1909–1992), road racing cyclist
 Luigi Marfut (1904–1980), boxer
 Luigi Musso (1924–1958), racing driver
 Luigi Piotti (1913–1971), racing driver
 Luigi Poggi (sailor) (1906–1972), sailor
 Luigi Taramazzo (1932–2004), racing driver
 Luigi Taveri (1929–2018), Swiss motorcycle road racer
 Luigi Villoresi (1909–1997), Grand Prix motor racing driver

Other
 Luigi Beccali (1907–1990), athlete, Olympic winner of 1500 metres
 Luigi Bosatra (1905–1981), track and field athlete who competed in racewalking
 Luigi Cambiaso (1895–1975), gymnast
 Luigi Cantone (1917–1997), fencer
 Luigi Castiglione (born 1967), boxer
 Luigi Contessi (1894–1967), gymnast
 Luigi Costigliolo (1892–1939), gymnast
 Luigi Datome (born 1987), basketball player
 Luigi Fioravanti (born 1981), American mixed martial artist
 Luigi Gaudiano (born 1965), boxer
 Luigi Guido (born 1968), judoka
 Luigi Maiocco (1892–1965), gymnast
 Luigi Mannelli (1939–2017), water polo player
 Luigi Mastrangelo (born 1975), volleyball player
 Luigi Rovati (1904–1989), boxer
 Luigi Tarantino (born 1972), fencer
 Luigi Troiani (born 1964), rugby player
 Luigi Ulivelli (1935–2010), long jumper
 Luigi Weiss (born 1951), ski mountaineer and biathlete

Visual arts
 Luigi Acquisti (1745–1823), sculptor
 Luigi Anichini, engraver of seals and medals
 Luigi Basiletti (1780–1860), painter
 Luigi Benfatto (1551–1611), late-Renaissance painter
 Luigi Boccherini (1743–1805), classical era composer and cellist
 Luigi Borgomainerio, engraver and caricaturist
 Luigi Calamatta (1801–1868), painter and engraver
 Luigi Crosio (1835–1915), Turin-based Italian painter
 Luigi De Giudici (1887–1955), painter
 Luigi Diamante (1904–1971), painter
 Luigi Fontana (1827–1908), sculptor, painter, and architect
 Luigi Frisoni (1760–1811), painter
 Luigi Ghirri (1943–1992), photographer
 Luigi Garzi (1638–1721), Baroque painter
 Luigi Guardigli (1923–2008), painter and mosaicist
 Luigi Kasimir (1881–1962), Austro-Hungarian-born etcher, painter, printmaker, and landscape artist
 Luigi Lanzi (1732–1810), art historian and archaeologist
 Luigi Lucioni (1900–1988), Italian-born American painter
 Luigi Malice (born 1937), artist
 Luigi Manini (1848–1936), European set designer and architect
 Luigi Mascelli (1804-1825), Italian goldsmith
 Luigi Melchiorre (1859 – c. 1908), Italian sculptor
 Luigi Miradori (1600s – c. 1656), Baroque painter
 Luigi Mussini (1813–1888), painter
 Luigi Nono (painter) (1850–1918), Italian painter
 Luigi Pellegrini Scaramuccia (1616–1680), Baroque painter and artist biographer
 Luigi Primo (c. 1605–1667), Flemish Baroque painter
 Luigi Quaini (1643–1717), Baroque painter
 Luigi Rados (1773–1840), engraver
 Luigi Riccardi (1807–1877), painter
 Luigi Russolo (1885–1947), Futurist painter and composer
 Luigi Sabatelli (1772–1850), Neoclassical painter
 Luigi Schiavonetti (1765–1810), reproductive engraver and etcher
 Luigi Serafini (artist) (born 1946), artist, architect, and designer
 Luigi Trinchero (1862–1944), sculptor

Other fields
 Luigi Bertoni (1872–1947), Italian-born anarchist writer and typographer
 Luigi Borrelli, Naples-based shirts maker
 Luigi Calabresi (1937–1972), commissioner of Italian police in Milan
 Luigi Carrel (1901–1983), mountain climber, mountain guide, and ski mountaineer
 Luigi D'Albertis (1841–1901), naturalist and explorer
 Luigi Galleani (1861–1931), anarchist
 Luigi Lavazza (1859–1949), businessman
 Luigi Manzotti (1835–1905), choreographer
 Luigi Ossoinack (1849–1904), Hungarian businessman and politician
 Luigi Puccianti (1875–1952), Italian physicist
 Luigi Veronelli (1926–2004), gastronome and intellectual
 Luigi Villa, backgammon player
 Luigi Voltan, the founder of the eponymous shoe company

Fictional characters 

 Luigi, a Nintendo video game character and the younger twin brother of Mario from the Super Mario franchise
 Luigi, a Fiat 500 car from Pixar's Cars franchise
 Luigi Vendetta, in Kick Buttowski
 Luigi Risotto, from the animated sitcom The Simpsons

See also
Luigi (disambiguation)
Louis (name)

References 

Italian masculine given names